Vijaya Krishna Naresh (born 20 January 1964), known mononymously as Naresh, is an Indian actor, politician and social activist known for his works predominantly in Telugu cinema and television. He began acting as a child in 1970, and starred in around 200 films in a variety of roles as both lead and supporting actor. Some of the box office successes he appeared in were Rendu Jella Sita (1983), Sreevariki Prema Lekha (1984), Sri Kanaka Mahalaxmi Recording Dance Troupe (1987), Bava Bava Panneeru (1989), Manasu Mamatha (1990) and Jamba Lakidi Pamba (1993). He also received the title H.E. (his Excellency) and received a PhD in arts (his 2nd doctorate) from the United Nations ICDRHRP group.

Early and personal life
Naresh is son of actress Vijaya Nirmala and her first husband, K. S. Murthy. He mentioned in a TV interview that his father died when he was young and that he doesn't remember much about him. Naresh was married four times as of 2023. Naresh first married the daughter of senior dance master Srinu and the couple has a son named Naveen Vijaykrishna. Naresh divorced his first wife and married Rekha Supriya, the granddaughter of famous poet and film lyricist Devulapalli Krishna Shastri. and the couple also has a son named Teja. Naresh divorced his second wife. After crossing his 50s, he married Ramya Raghupathi who was 20 years younger than him. The couple has a son..In 2023 he married for the fourth time to Kannada actress Pavithra Lokesh

Career

Film 
Naresh made his debut as a child actor in the film Pandanti Kapuram (1972) as well as Kavitha, and Santosh Sowbhagyam. He later made his debut as a lead actor, at the age of 17, with the box office hit Nalugu Stambhalata (1982), directed by Sri Jandhyala and produced by Navata Krishnam Raju. He followed it up with Prema Sankellu (1982), which was directed by his mother Vijaya Nirmala. His other notable works include Rendu Jella Sita (1983), Sreevariki Prema Lekha (1984), Sri Kanaka Mahalaxmi Recording Dance Troupe (1987), Bava Bava Panneeru (1989), Manasu Mamatha (1990), Jamba Lakidi Pamba  (1993), and Gunasekhar's Sogasu Chuda Taramaa? (1995).
After a small hiatus, he started his second innings as a supporting actor with Allari Ramudu in 2002, and then went on to appear in many memorable films such as: Dhanalakshmi, I Love You (2002), Malliswari (2004), Oka Oorilo (2005), Mee Sreyobhilashi (2007), Andari Bandhuvaya (2010), 100% Love (2011), Chandamama Kathalu and  Drushyam (2014), Bhale Bhale Magadivoy (2015), Guntur Talkies (2016), Sathamanam Bhavati (2017), Rangasthalam (2018), and Sammohanam (2018).

Naresh served as the president of the Movie Artists Association.

Politics 
Naresh is also an active politician, and a member of Bharatiya Janata Party state leader.

He worked as a state youth wing president of AP, and state secretary BJP, state general secretary vice president of BJP and also contested from Hindupur parliamentary seat. He also did a 125 km Padayatra from Icchampally Project to Warangal alongside C. Vidyasagar Rao for linking of "Krishna and Godavari" waters and is active in the Rayalaseema development. He is the founder president of KIV Kalakarula Ikya Vidika an NGO a non-profit and non-governmental organization, which works to protect ancient arts and support artists.

Filmography

Film 

 All films are in Telugu unless otherwise noted.

Television

Accolades 
Naresh received the state Nandi Award for Best Actor for Sogasu Chuda Taramaa? (1995), the Nandi Special Jury Award for Chitram Bhalare Vichitram (1992), and the platinum award for best feature film, Parampara (2014). He has also received one Television Nandi Award for his work in Doordarshan's Munimanikyam Gari Kantham Kadhalu.

He starred in the films Shrutilayalu (1987), that premiered at the International Film Festival of India and Hindustan The Mother (2000), which premiered at the International Film Festival of India, BFI London Film Festival and Mumbai Film Festival. In 2007 he appeared in Mee Sreyobhilashi, which also premiered at the International Film Festival of India. In 2014, he acted in Parampara, which won the Platinum Award for Best Feature at the International Indonesian Movie Awards, and premiered at the Jakarta International Film Festival.

Naresh received the Servant Of The Poor award on the occasion of the 4th national meet of CNRI held during 4–6 November 2009 at New Delhi, presented by the union Minister for Rural Development C. P. Joshi.

In 2017, he spoke about displaying arts in Indian films at the University of Bedfordshire in the presence of the vice chancellor.

Awards
 Nandi Award for Best Actor – Sogasu Chuda Taramaa? (1994)
 Nandi Special Jury Award  – Chitram Bhalare Vichitram (1992)
 Nandi Award for Best Character Actor - Parampara (2013)
 Nandi Award for Best Character Actor - Sathamanam Bhavati (2017)
Best Character Actor Award - Sathamanam Bhavati (2017) at 17th Santosham Film Awards
 Nandi Best Actor Television – Munimanikyam Gari Kantham Kadhalu (1991)
 SVR Character Award - Sathamanam Bhavati (2017)
 Received the title H.E. (his Excellency) and received a PhD in arts from the U.N. ICDRHRP (2018)

References

External links
 

Telugu male actors
Living people
Bharatiya Janata Party politicians from Andhra Pradesh
Telugu politicians
Male actors from Andhra Pradesh
Indian male comedians
Telugu comedians
Filmfare Awards South winners
Indian male film actors
Male actors in Hindi cinema
Male actors in Tamil cinema
Nandi Award winners
Indian actor-politicians
Ramakrishna Mission schools alumni
People from Anantapur district
Male actors in Telugu cinema
20th-century Indian male actors
Santosham Film Awards winners
1960 births